Al Benedict (c. 1929 – August 31, 2003) was an American politician who served as Pennsylvania Auditor General from 1977 to 1985. He was convicted on federal racketeering and tax fraud charges in 1988 and sentenced to six years in prison.

Life and career 
A Democrat from McKeesport and a former WSEE-TV anchor and Erie controller, Benedict was considered a top candidate for governor before his chief aide, John Kerr, pleaded guilty to federal corruption charges related to job-selling in 1984. 

Limited to two terms as auditor general, Benedict won the Democratic nomination for Pennsylvania Treasurer in 1984, defeating Lieutenant Governor Catherine Baker Knoll. Benedict went on to lose the general election to Republican nominee Budd Dwyer, who was convicted on federal bribery charges two years later and committed suicide on television. 

In 1988, Benedict pleaded guilty to federal racketeering and tax fraud charges and served two years of a six-year prison sentence. After his release, he worked as a salesman and apartment manager and moved Florida in 1994.

References 

1930s births
2003 deaths
People from McKeesport, Pennsylvania
Pennsylvania Democrats
20th-century American politicians
Pennsylvania Auditors General
Pennsylvania politicians convicted of corruption
Politicians convicted of racketeering